Verlaine is a municipality of Wallonia located in the province of Liège, Belgium. 

On January 1, 2006, Verlaine had a total population of 3,507. The total area is 24.21 km2 which gives a population density of 145 inhabitants per km2.

The municipality consists of the following districts: Bodegnée, Chapon-Seraing, Seraing-le-Château and Verlaine.

See also
 List of protected heritage sites in Verlaine

References

External links
 

Municipalities of Liège Province